Peter Hyballa (born 5 December 1975) is a German professional football manager who is the head coach of Eerste Divisie club NAC Breda. He also served as manager at clubs in Germany, Namibia, Austria, the Netherlands, Poland, Denmark and Slovakia.

Before his career as a manager, Hyballa coached various youth teams in his native Germany, including the U19 sides of Arminia Bielefeld, VfL Wolfsburg and Borussia Dortmund.

In 2010, he took over as head coach of 2. Bundesliga club Alemannia Aachen. He then managed the Red Bull Salzburg reserves and Sturm Graz in Austria for two years. From 2014 to 2016, he was assistant and youth coach at Bayer Leverkusen. Hyballa was then appointed manager of NEC in 2016, where he quickly became known for his fanatical way of coaching, his controversial statements in interviews and behavior during matches. He moved to Slovakian club DAC Dunajská Streda in 2018, after being fired in NEC due to poor results. There, he had some success, leading the club to a second-place finish in 2019. Shorter spells with NAC Breda and Wisła Kraków followed, where he was dismissed after conflicts with management (in Poland with Jakub Blaszczykowski and Kazimierz Kmiecik). In May 2021, he became the head coach of Danish club Esbjerg fB, but resigned a few months later amid clashes with first-team players and reports of physical and mental abuse. Again, shorter stints followed at Türkgücü München and AS Trenčín, before returning to NAC Breda.

Early life
Hyballa was born in Bocholt, North Rhine-Westphalia to Yvonne and Hans-Joachim Hyballa. His mother is Dutch and hails from Rotterdam, and met his German father, a deacon, in Hamburg in 1971.

Managerial career

Early career
In his first coaching positions, Hyballa was initially in charge of youth teams, for example at his hometown clubs Borussia Bocholt and 1. FC Bocholt, where he coached the U17s for two years. In 1998 he was discovered by Preußen Münster, where he became responsible for the U17 for the next three years. In 2001, Hyballa moved from Münster to Arminia Bielefeld, where he took on the position of U19 youth coach. After a short stint from 2002 to 2003 at Namibian club Ramblers Windhoek, where had his first head coaching job, he returned to Germany.

From 2003 to 2007, Hyballa coached the U19s of VfL Wolfsburg and in 2007, he led the team to the final of the DFB U19 Cup, which was lost 1–2 to 1860 Munich.

In the summer of 2007, Hyballa took over the U19s from Borussia Dortmund. There, he won the 2008 Westphalia Cup, the 2009 West German title, finished runner-up of the 2009 DFB U19 Cup as well as runner-up to the 2008–09 Under 19 Bundesliga. The cup final was lost to the youth team of SC Freiburg on penalties, and in the final of the German U19 championship Hyballa's team was defeated by Thomas Tuchel's U19s from 1. FSV Mainz 05 with 1–2 the final score.

On 15 April 2010, Hyballa signed a two-year contract as head coach of Rot-Weiss Essen. After the club filed for bankruptcy on 4 June 2010, the contract was dissolved and Alemannia Aachen hired him as head coach of their 2. Bundesliga team from the 2010–11 season on a two-year contract. On 13 September 2011, Hyballa and his assistant coach Eric van der Luer were given leave of absence, and their contracts were terminated by mutual agreement. At that time, Alemannia Aachen only had three points and scored one goal, which meant that they were bottom of the league table.

From January 2012 to June 2012, Peter Hyballa was the coach of the Red Bull Salzburg reserves, where he was tasked with transitioning youth players to the first team.

For the 2012–13 season, Hyballa signed a two-year contract with Sturm Graz, but was dismissed while in the race for a UEFA Europa League spot on 22 April 2013.

For the final games of the 2013–14 season, Hyballa returned to Germany as Sascha Lewandowski's assistant coach at Bayer Leverkusen. Lewandowski had become caretaker coach after Sami Hyypiä was dismissed from as manager. Both signed a contract until the end of the season and achieved the goal of qualifying for the UEFA Champions League. After the Bundesliga season was over, Hyballa stayed with Leverkusen in a new position; in June 2014 he signed a two-year contract as head coach of the Leverkusen U19s.

After the end of his contract at the end in June 2016, Hyballa left Leverkusen.

NEC
In May 2016, Eredivisie club NEC announced that Hyballa would become manager of the club from the summer, signing a two-year contract.

Hyballa immediately stood out for his fanatical way of coaching, his controversial statements in interviews and behavior during matches. Hyballa managed to keep the team in mid-table during the first half of the season, but the team would experience a drop after the winter break. Despite this, the club hinted at a contract extension, praising Hyballa's handling of players, personality and drive. After the team ended up in the relegation zone after successive defeats, the board offered to place a more experienced manager alongside him in April 2017. Hyballa declined the offer, which he saw as "panic football". On 22 April, after a defeat against Excelsior, the team were met by angry fans. Hyballa addressed the fans on behalf of the club and managed to turn the situation around.

Two days later, on 24 April 2017, he was dismissed, two matches prior to the end of the competition, due to poor results and imminent relegation.

DAC Dunajská Streda
The German Football Association announced in May 2018 that Hyballa would become a teacher at the German coaching course. However, he broke the contract in July 2018, after he was appointed head coach of Slovak Super Liga club DAC Dunajská Streda. He managed to lead the club to a position as runner-up in the 2018–19 season – their highest finish in 16 years.

There he was fired in January 2020 due to disagreements over a contract extension.

NAC Breda
He coached NAC Breda between February and July 2020, as the successor to Ruud Brood. He would eventually leave after five months following a conflict with technical director Tom van den Abbeele.

Wisła Kraków
On 3 December 2020, he signed a contract with the Polish Ekstraklasa side Wisła Kraków. On 14 May 2021 the Polish club announced that they had parted ways with Hyballa. The parting was preceded by a conflict with club legends Kazimierz Kmiecik and Jakub Błaszczykowski; the coach's results were also disappointing as Wisła was third from the bottom in the league standing when he left.

Esbjerg fB
Hyballa signed a two-year contract with Danish club Esbjerg fB on 24 May 2021. Less than two months into his tenure, Danish newspaper B.T. reported that first-team players demanded his dismissal after "mental and physical punishments". The following day, Spillerforeningen, the Danish Player's Association, reprimanded the Esbjerg board after the American chairman Michael Kalt had toned down the conflict and informed JydskeVestkysten that only a few players were involved in the demand. One day later, Hyballa demoted four key players to the U19 team: Yuriy Yakovenko, Jakob Ankersen, Kevin Conboy and Zean Dalügge. On 15 July, Esbjerg fB were reported to the Danish Labour Inspection Authority ("Arbejdstilsynet") by Spillerforeningen after reports came out that Hyballa had allegedly hit and "mentally terrorised" players. The following week, Hyballa stated that he had never hit anyone, and that he had only tried to motivate his players.

On 24 July, Hyballa appointed the 19-year-old Mads Larsen as the new team captain. Three days later, on 27 July, new accusations arose against Hyballa – this time from Kasper Pedersen – who had terminated his contract by mutual consent the day before. He stated that Hyballa had created a "horrible mood" and that he had left the club due to the manager.

On 28 July 21 of Esbjerg's first-team players sent an open letter to club management, expressing "strong distrust" to Hyballa. The letter, which was also published in several media outlets, mentions several episodes where Hyballa had physically or mentally abused players. Responding to the letter, investor and spokesperson for the Esbjerg board, Paul Conway, stated to JydskeVestkysten that "[i]t's so unprofessional, I've never experienced anything like it. It can never be the players who get to decide who get to play and who is the coach."

On 11 August after weeks of stories in the press and a bad start to the season, Hyballa resigned as manager of Esbjerg fB and was replaced by Roland Vrabec.

Türkgücü München
On 20 September 2021, he was appointed as the new head coach of Türkgücü München. He was sacked in November 2021.

AS Trenčín
Following the release in Munich, Hyballa returned to Fortuna Liga to manage AS Trenčín. Hyballa was released after less than two months after his appointment on 27 July 2022 due to "mutual evaluation of the current situation". His assistant Marián Zimen took on the managerial duties on a caretaker basis after the split. After just two league matchdays, in a press conference following 4-0 away defeat to reigning champions of Slovan Bratislava,  Hyballa was notably critical of the lack of quality and low transfer activity in the club.

Return to NAC Breda
On 18 January 2023, Hyballa was presented as NAC Breda's new head coach, following the dismissal of Robert Molenaar. This marked his return to the Netherlands after leaving NAC in 2020 due to a conflict with then-technical director Tom van den Abbeele.

Career statistics

References

External links

1975 births
Living people
People from Bocholt, Germany
Sportspeople from Münster (region)
German football managers
German expatriate football managers
Alemannia Aachen managers
2. Bundesliga managers
SK Sturm Graz managers
NEC Nijmegen managers
NAC Breda managers
FC DAC 1904 Dunajská Streda managers
Wisła Kraków managers
Esbjerg fB managers
AS Trenčín managers
Eredivisie managers
Eerste Divisie managers
Slovak Super Liga managers
Expatriate football managers in Austria
German expatriate sportspeople in Austria
Expatriate football managers in the Netherlands
German expatriate sportspeople in the Netherlands
Expatriate football managers in Slovakia
German expatriate sportspeople in Slovakia
Expatriate football managers in Denmark
German expatriate sportspeople in Denmark
Expatriate football managers in Poland
German expatriate sportspeople in Poland
German people of Dutch descent
Danish 1st Division managers
3. Liga managers